= Sakha names =

After the Yakuts adopted Christianity from the Russians, they began to use Russian clerical names in official concerns. The naming conventions are similar to those of Russian names.

The original Sakha names were used in unofficial settings, but eventually the official clerical names dominated. Nowadays, most of the Sakha people have names belonging to the tradition of the former Soviet Union.

Present-day original Sakha names are usually derived from the names of mythological heroes, names of places, names of plants or animals etc. For example, the names Elley (Эллэй), Manchaary (Манчаары), Tuyaara (Туйаара), Nyurgun (Ньургун), and Künney (Күннэй) are the names of mythological or historical heroes and are quite common among Sakha people.

Present-day original Sakha names are derived from the names of "positive" objects. But in the past, children were often named after "bad", "disgusting" objects in order to hide the children from evil spirits. People with such "bad" names often used official Christian names in everyday life when they grow up.

== Frequently used original Sakha names ==
=== Male ===
- Aysen (Айсен)
- Nyurgun (Ньургун)
- Elley (Эллэй)
- Aytal (Айтал)
- Manchaary (Манчаары)
- Ayaal (Айаал)
- Michil (Мичил)
- Keskil (Кэскил)
- Ayhal (Айхал)
- Uygulaan (Уйгулаан)

=== Female ===
- Tuyaara (Туйаара)
- Sardaana (Сардаана)
- Künney (Күннэй)
- Sayõõna (Сайыына)
- Nyurguyaana (Ньургуйаана)
- Karachaane (Кэрэчээнэ)
- Uruydaana (Уруйдаана)
- Sayaana (Сайаана)
- Sahayaana (Сахайаана)
- Tuskulaana (Тускулаана)
- Kaskilaane (Кэскилээнэ)
- Naryyanaa ( Нарыйаана)
- Saskylaana (Саскылаана)
- Ayta (Айта)
